Listed below are the dates and results for the 2006 FIFA World Cup qualification rounds for UEFA teams. A total of 51 teams took part, divided in 8 groups – five groups of six teams each and three groups of seven teams each – competing for 13 places in the World Cup. Germany, the hosts, were already qualified, for a total of 14 European places in the tournament. The qualifying process started on 18 August 2004, over a month after the end of UEFA Euro 2004, and ended on 16 November 2005. Kazakhstan, which transitioned from the Asian Football Confederation to UEFA after the end of the 2002 FIFA World Cup, debuted in the European qualifiers.

The teams in each group would play against each other in a home and away basis. The team with the most points in each group qualified to the World Cup. The runners up are ranked. For fairness rules, results against the seventh placed team were ignored, in groups of seven teams. The two best ranked runners-up also qualified to the World Cup. The other six runners-up were drawn into three two-legged knock out matches, the playoff winners also qualifying.

The race to join hosts Germany at the 2006 FIFA World Cup featured an unlikely winner in Europe, where Ukraine became the first team to qualify, having finished above Turkey, Denmark and Greece in arguably the continent's toughest qualifying group.

France had its first successful World Cup qualifying campaign in twenty years as they had missed the 1990 and 1994 tournaments, then qualified automatically as hosts in 1998 and as defending champions in 2002.

Serbia and Montenegro and Croatia also advanced to Germany at the head of their sections, the former forcing Spain into the playoffs in the process. Besides the eight group winners, two teams progressed automatically as best runners up, namely Poland and Sweden while the playoffs offered a second chance to six others.

Qualification seeding (UEFA)
The draw was made on 5 December 2003 in Frankfurt, Germany. Germany qualified automatically as hosts. The other seedings were determined by points per game in the qualifiers for 2002 FIFA World Cup qualification and UEFA Euro 2004 qualifying. France qualified automatically for the 2002 FIFA World Cup as title holders, so only their record in UEFA Euro 2004 qualifying was used. Portugal qualified automatically for UEFA Euro 2004 as hosts, so only their record in World Cup 2002 was used. Kazakhstan were not ranked by this system as they did not participate in either competition.

For domestic clubs involved in international club competitions reasons, England, France, Italy and Spain were drawn into groups of 6 teams.

Teams in bold eventually qualified for the final tournament, teams in bold italic qualified for the final tournament through the play-offs, and teams in italic participated in the play-offs but did not qualify for the final tournament.

First round

Summary

Groups
The first round is group play. A win is awarded 3 point, a draw 1 point and a loss 0. The winner of a group is the team with the most points.

Group 1

Group 2

Group 3

Group 4

Group 5

Group 6

Group 7

Group 8

Play-offs

Ranking of runners-up

Matches

|}

Qualified teams
The following 14 teams from UEFA qualified for the final tournament.

1 Bold indicates champions for that year. Italic indicates hosts for that year.
2 Competed as West Germany. A separate team for East Germany also participated in qualifications during this time, having only competed in 1974.
3 From 1930 to 1998, Serbia and Montenegro competed as Yugoslavia.
4 From 1934 to 1990, Czech Republic competed as Czechoslovakia.

Goalscorers

11 goals

 Pauleta

9 goals

 Jan Koller

8 goals

 Alexei Eremenko
 Zlatan Ibrahimović

7 goals

 Dimitar Berbatov
 Tomáš Rosický
 Andres Oper
 Ruud Van Nistelrooy
 Tomasz Frankowski
 Maciej Żurawski
 Cristiano Ronaldo
 Adrian Mutu
 Fernando Torres
 Freddie Ljungberg
 Alexander Frei
 Fatih Tekke

6 goals

 Jon Dahl Tomasson
 Eiður Guðjohnsen
 Róbert Vittek
 Tuncay
 Andriy Shevchenko

5 goals

 Elvir Bolić
 Darijo Srna
 Milan Baroš
 Vratislav Lokvenc
 Søren Larsen
 Frank Lampard
 Giorgi Demetradze
 Māris Verpakovskis
 Goran Pandev
 Andrei Arshavin
 Mateja Kežman
 Henrik Larsson

4 goals

 Erjon Bogdani
 Vitali Kutuzov
 Dado Pršo
 Michalis Konstantinou
 Jan Polák
 Michael Owen
 Mikael Forssell
 Djibril Cissé
 Zoltán Gera
 Robbie Keane
 Yossi Benayoun
 Luca Toni
 Juris Laizāns
 Phillip Cocu
 Jacek Krzynówek
 Aleksandr Kerzhakov
 Dmitri Sychev
 Zvonimir Vukić
 Miroslav Karhan
 Szilárd Németh
 Johan Vonlanthen

3 goals

 René Aufhauser
 Markus Schopp
 Maksim Romaschenko
 Koen Daerden
 Sergej Barbarez
 Martin Petrov
 Martin Jørgensen
 Malkhaz Asatiani
 Angelos Charisteas
 Stelios Giannakopoulos
 Clinton Morrison
 Avi Nimni
 Thomas Beck
 Franz Burgmeier
 Mario Frick
 Edgaras Jankauskas
 Serghei Rogaciov
 Dirk Kuyt
 David Healy
 John Carew
 Hélder Postiga
 Simão
 Daniel Pancu
 Kenny Miller
 Marek Mintál
 Ľubomír Reiter
 Milenko Ačimovič
 Luis García
 Raúl
 Alexandre Rey
 Tümer Metin
 Andriy Husin
 Ruslan Rotan
 Ryan Giggs

2 goals

 Igli Tare
 Ara Hakobyan
 Aram Hakobyan
 Roland Kollmann
 Roland Linz
 Martin Stranzl
 Vital Bulyga
 Thomas Buffel
 Émile Mpenza
 Mbo Mpenza
 Timmy Simons
 Daniel Van Buyten
 Hasan Salihamidžić
 Hristo Yanev
 Chavdar Yankov
 Boško Balaban
 Niko Kranjčar
 Igor Tudor
 Ioannis Okkas
 Marek Heinz
 Vladimír Šmicer
 Michael Gravgaard
 Claus Jensen
 Peter Møller
 Christian Poulsen
 David Beckham
 Joe Cole
 Steven Gerrard
 Ingemar Teever
 Kristen Viikmäe
 Rógvi Jacobsen
 Shefki Kuqi
 Aki Riihilahti
 Ludovic Giuly
 Thierry Henry
 Sylvain Wiltord
 Alexander Iashvili
 Péter Rajczi
 Sándor Torghelle
 Ian Harte
 Walid Badir
 Adoram Keisi
 Daniele De Rossi
 Alberto Gilardino
 Andrea Pirlo
 Francesco Totti
 Vitālijs Astafjevs
 Imants Bleidelis
 Andrejs Prohorenkovs
 Mihails Zemļinskis
 Benjamin Fischer
 Goran Maznov
 Arjen Robben
 Wesley Sneijder
 Rafael Van der Vaart
 Pierre Van Hooijdonk
 Stuart Elliott
 Morten Gamst Pedersen
 Kamil Kosowski
 Marek Saganowski
 Petit
 Gheorghe Bucur
 Florin Cernat
 Nicolae Mitea
 Marat Izmailov
 Andrei Karyaka
 Dmitri Kirichenko
 Dmitri Loskov
 Andy Selva
 James McFadden
 Nenad Jestrović
 Dejan Stanković
 Albert Luque
 Sergio Ramos
 Anders Svensson
 Christian Wilhelmsson
 Philippe Senderos
 Necati Ateş
 Nihat Kahveci
 Oleksiy Byelik
 Robert Earnshaw
 John Hartson

1 goal

 Adrian Aliaj
 Alban Bushi
 Edwin Murati
 Florian Myrtaj
 Ervin Skela
 Marc Bernaus
 Marc Pujol
 Gabriel Riera
 Fernando Silva
 Karen Dokhoyan
 Romik Khachatryan
 Edgar Manucharyan
 Armen Shahgeldyan
 Andreas Ivanschitz
 Christian Mayrleb
 Ivica Vastić
 Rəşad Sadıqov
 Valentin Belkevich
 Alyaksandr Kulchiy
 Sergei Omelyanchuk
 Karel Geraerts
 Wesley Sonck
 Kevin Vandenbergh
 Zlatan Bajramović
 Zvjezdan Misimović
 Georgi Iliev
 Zdravko Lazarov
 Stiliyan Petrov
 Marko Babić
 Ivan Klasnić
 Niko Kovač
 Josip Šimunić
 Efstathios Aloneftis
 Asimakis Krassas
 Tomáš Galásek
 Marek Jankulovski
 Tomáš Jun
 Daniel Agger
 Dennis Rommedahl
 Jermain Defoe
 Joel Lindpere
 Maksim Smirnov
 Andrei Stepanov
 Sergei Terehhov
 Claus Bech Jørgensen
 Símun Samuelsen
 Jonatan Johansson
 Jari Litmanen
 Paulus Roiha
 Teemu Tainio
 Hannu Tihinen
 Vikash Dhorasoo
 David Trezeguet
 Zinedine Zidane
 Aleksandr Amisulashvili
 Vladimir Burduli
 Giorgi Gakhokidze
 Levan Kobiashvili
 Angelos Basinas
 Michalis Kapsis
 Giorgos Karagounis
 Kostas Katsouranis
 Nikos Liberopoulos
 Dimitris Papadopoulos
 Vassilios Tsiartas
 Zisis Vryzas
 Theodoros Zagorakis
 Szabolcs Huszti
 Péter Kovács
 Imre Szabics
 Ákos Takács
 Kári Árnason
 Veigar Páll Gunnarsson
 Tryggvi Guðmundsson
 Hermann Hreiðarsson
 Indriði Sigurðsson
 Kristján Örn Sigurðsson
 Grétar Steinsson
 Gunnar Heiðar Þorvaldsson
 Stephen Elliott
 Kevin Kilbane
 Andy Reid
 Yaniv Katan
 Abbas Souan
 Avi Yehiel
 Michael Zandberg
 Mauro Camoranesi
 Alessandro Del Piero
 Fabio Grosso
 Christian Vieri
 Cristian Zaccardo
 Ruslan Baltiev
 Andrei Karpovich
 Daniar Kenzhekhanov
 Aleksandr Kuchma
 Maksim Nizovtsev
 Maksim Zhalmagambetov
 Fabio D'Elia
 Martin Stocklasa
 Deividas Česnauskis
 Tomas Danilevičius
 Andrius Gedgaudas
 Marius Stankevičius
 Gordon Braun
 Manuel Cardoni
 Alphonse Leweck
 Claude Reiter
 Jeff Strasser
 Artim Šakiri
 Aco Stojkov
 Veliče Šumulikoski
 Aleksandar Vasoski
 Michael Mifsud
 Brian Said
 Stephen Wellman 
 Antoine Zahra
 Serghei Dadu
 Alexandru Gațcan
 Ryan Babel
 Wilfred Bouma
 Romeo Castelen
 Barry Opdam
 Robin Van Persie
 Steven Davis
 Warren Feeney
 Keith Gillespie
 Colin Murdock
 Jeff Whitley
 Thorstein Helstad
 Steffen Iversen
 Claus Lundekvam
 Vidar Riseth
 Sigurd Rushfeldt
 Alexander Ødegaard
 Ole Martin Årst
 Euzebiusz Smolarek
 Radosław Kałużny
 Tomasz Kłos
 Piotr Włodarczyk
 Jorge Andrade
 Ricardo Carvalho
 Deco
 Nuno Gomes
 Maniche
 Fernando Meira
 Hugo Viana
 Ciprian Marica
 Marius Niculae
 Florentin Petre
 Ovidiu Petre
 Dmitri Bulykin
 Roman Pavlyuchenko
 Christian Dailly
 Darren Fletcher
 Paul Hartley
 Steven Thompson
 Saša Ilić
 Ognjen Koroman
 Savo Milošević
 Igor Demo
 Vratislav Greško
 Peter Hlinka
 Filip Hološko
 Karol Kisel
 Radoslav Zabavník
 Nastja Čeh
 Boštjan Cesar
 Sebastjan Cimirotič
 Klemen Lavrič
 Matej Mavrič
 Aleksander Rodić
 Anton Žlogar
 Guti
 Asier del Horno
 Joaquín
 Antonio López Guerrero
 Carlos Marchena
 Fernando Morientes
 Vicente Rodríguez
 David Villa
 Marcus Allbäck
 Erik Edman
 Johan Elmander
 Mattias Jonson
 Kim Källström
 Olof Mellberg
 Valon Behrami
 Daniel Gygax
 Ludovic Magnin
 Marco Streller
 Raphaël Wicky
 Hakan Yakin
 Halil Altıntop
 Koray Avcı
 Yıldıray Baştürk
 Okan Buruk
 Gökdeniz Karadeniz
 Tolga Seyhan
 İbrahim Toraman
 Oleh Husyev
 Andriy Rusol
 Andriy Voronin
 Simon Davies
 Carl Robinson
 Gary Speed

1 own goal

 Óscar Sonejee (playing against Armenia)
 Avtandil Hacıyev (playing against Poland)
 Olivier Deschacht (playing against Lithuania)
 Súni Olsen (playing against France)
 Gábor Gyepes (playing against Croatia)
 Igor Avdeev (playing against Ukraine)
 Daniel Hasler (playing against Portugal)
 Ben Federspiel (playing against Portugal)
 Eric Hoffmann (playing against Latvia)
 Manuel Schauls (playing against Estonia)
 Brian Said (playing against Hungary)
 Arkadiusz Głowacki (playing against England)

References

External links
 UEFA Qualifier results with full game box scores at Scoreshelf.com

 
UEFA
FIFA World Cup qualification (UEFA)
World
World